The Roman switch line was a German line of defense during World War II in Italy branching off the Caesar C line and running north of Rome towards coast of the Tyrrhenian Sea.  The next line was Trasimene Line in central Italy which was intended to delay the Allies and allow the completion of the Gothic Line a major defensive works north of Florence.

See also
Battle of Anzio

German World War II defensive lines
Italian campaign (World War II)